The President of Kurdistan Region is the head of the autonomous region in northern Iraq. They are part of the Kurdistan Presidency Council. The current President of Kurdistan Region is Nechirvan Barzani, who assumed office on 10 June 2019.

List of presidents

1992–2005 
After the 1992 parliamentary election resulted in the two main parties, the Kurdistan Democratic Party (KDP) and the Patriotic Union of Kurdistan (PUK), each holding 50 out of 100 seats, they decided to create a unity government (which was not recognized by the Ba'athist Iraq, led by Saddam Hussein).

The unity government soon collapsed and in 1994 a civil war broke out, which lasted until 1998. This resulted in the establishment of two Kurdistan Regional Governments in 1996, a KDP-controlled one in Erbil and a PUK-controlled one in Sulaymaniyah, each with their own President.

2005–present 
After an official reconciliation between the KDP and PUK in October 2002, parliamentary elections were held on 30 January 2005 and on 14 June 2005 the KDP-leader Masoud Barzani was sworn in by the parliament in as new president and Kosrat Rasul Ali as the new Vice President of Kurdistan Region. In 2009 the system was changed to elect the president and on 25 July 2009 presidential election were held resulting in Barzani's re-election. On 29 October 2017, amidst the 2017 Iraqi–Kurdish conflict, Barzani announced his intentions to step down as president, effective 1 November.

President of Kurdistan Region:

Election results

See also

Prime Minister of Kurdistan Region
Vice President of Kurdistan Region

References

Government of Kurdistan Region
1992 establishments in Iraq
Politics of Kurdistan Region (Iraq)